Ohio Stadium is an American football stadium in Columbus, Ohio, on the campus of Ohio State University. It primarily serves as the home venue of the Ohio State Buckeyes football team and is also the site for the university's Spring Commencement ceremonies each May. Common nicknames for the stadium include "the Horseshoe", "the Shoe", and "the House That Harley Built".

From 1996 to 1998, Ohio Stadium was the home venue for the Columbus Crew of Major League Soccer prior to the opening of Columbus Crew Stadium in 1999. The stadium also was the home venue for the OSU track and field teams from 1923 to 2001. In addition to athletics, Ohio Stadium is also a concert venue, with U2, Taylor Swift, The Rolling Stones, Genesis, Pink Floyd, and Metallica among the many acts to have played at the venue.

The stadium opened in 1922 as a replacement for Ohio Field and had a seating capacity of 66,210. In 1923, a cinder running track was added that was later upgraded to an all-weather track. Seating capacity gradually increased over the years and reached a total of 91,470 possible spectators in 1991. Beginning in 2000, the stadium was renovated and expanded in several phases, removing the track and adding additional seating, which raised the capacity to 101,568 by 2001 and to 102,329 in 2007. In 2014, additional seating was added in the end zone, raising the official capacity to 104,944. Another renovation to add more luxury suites began in 2017 and will eventually lead to a decrease of 2,600 seats. It is the largest stadium by capacity in the state of Ohio, and the third largest on-campus football stadium in the United States. Ohio Stadium was added to the National Register of Historic Places in 1974.

Construction
As early as 1913, Ohio Field at High Street and Woodruff Avenue was unable to contain the crowds attracted to many Buckeye home football games. This led to faculty discussion of moving the site elsewhere and building a new facility. The growing popularity of football in Ohio led to the design of a horseshoe-shaped stadium, conceptualized and designed by architect Howard Dwight Smith in 1918. A public-subscription Stadium Campaign to fund the project began in October 1920 and raised over $1.1 million in pledges by January 1921, of which $975,001 were actually honored.

The stadium was built in 1922 by E. H. Latham Company of Columbus, with materials and labor from the Marble Cliff Quarry Co. at a construction cost of $1.34 million and a total cost of $1.49 million. The stadium's original capacity was 66,210. Upon completion, it was the largest poured concrete structure in the world. Many university officials feared that the stadium would never be filled to capacity.

Smith employed numerous revolutionary architectural techniques while building the stadium. At the base is a slurry wall to keep out the waters from the Olentangy River; the stadium rests on the flood plain. Instead of building a large bowl like the previously constructed Yale Bowl, Ohio Stadium was designed to have an upper deck that would hang over part of the lower deck, giving Ohio Stadium its "A", "B", and "C" decks. Instead of employing numerous columns like those at Harvard Stadium, Smith designed double columns that allow for more space between columns. The rotunda at the north end of the stadium, which is now adorned with stained glass murals of the offensive and defensive squads that comprise the Buckeye football team, was designed to look like the dome at the Pantheon in Rome.

History

The first game in the stadium was against Ohio Wesleyan University on October 7, 1922, and brought a crowd of around 25,000, which left people concerned because the stadium was half empty. This concern was put to rest at the stadium's formal dedication against Michigan on October 21, which the Wolverines won, 19–0. The crowd was announced at the game to be 72,000, but no one is really sure how many people made it into the stadium. This attendance mark was broken in a game against Michigan in 1926 when 90,411 came out to support the Buckeyes; this is also the last time standing-room-only tickets were sold for a game.

The stadium did not regularly sell out until after World War II, and in the 1920s and 1930s most games only drew in 20,000 or 30,000 fans with many more attending the annual game against Michigan. The 1935 contest with Notre Dame was a sellout, with over 81,000 in attendance.

In 1923, a cinder track was built around the football field, which would later be named after Olympian and Ohio State athlete Jesse Owens. The stadium was home to the OSU track and field teams until the opening of Jesse Owens Memorial Stadium in 2001.

Renovations
As time passed, minor adjustments raised the seating capacity to more than 90,000. In 1984, a new $2.1 million scoreboard was installed. The stadium was heavily renovated from 1998 to 2001. The press box was replaced, additional seating was installed, and 81 luxury suites and 2,500 club seats were added. The south end zone scoreboard was also replaced by a  video board that is able to show replays, highlights, animations, graphics and statistical information. Additionally, a smaller version of the south end scoreboard was added to the north end and a new LED ribbon board that runs end-zone to end-zone was added to the balcony prior to the 2009 season. In 1998, the track was removed and a  slurry wall was built underneath the field to allow it to be lowered , which places it below the water table. After the 1999 season, the field of play was lowered to add seating closer to the field. The temporary bleachers in the south end zone were replaced with permanent seating. However, the south end of the stadium remains partially open, thus allowing the stadium to maintain its notable horseshoe configuration. General improvements were made in the seating and concourse areas. The result of the $194 million renovation was a capacity that rose to 101,568. 80% of the cost of the renovation was funded by the sale of leases on the suites and club seats, with the remaining 20% funded by donations and the sale of naming rights for portions of the stadium. No public or university money was spent in the renovation process.

In 1971, the natural grass field was removed, and AstroTurf was installed, compliments of a donation by Lou Fisher in dedication to fellow football player Joseph Campanella. A plaque was placed on the southeast corner in memory of Campanella. In 1979, the surface was replaced with SuperTurf. In 1990, natural grass made its return to the Horseshoe, in the form of a special grass called "Prescription Athletic Turf." New field designs were put in place for the 1992 season and existed through the 2006 season. During the 2006 season, problems with the natural grass began to arise. After serious damage to the field during use in the spring of 2006, the field never recovered and had to be re-sodded. That grass never took root because of bad weather, and the university was forced to re-sod the field again only three weeks after the old sod was laid. The university spent approximately $150,000 to perform both soddings. In response to this, OSU replaced the natural grass with FieldTurf for the 2007 season. This new artificial turf looks and feels like real grass but requires minimal upkeep.

In March 2012 the university announced a $7 million renovation to the scoreboard installed during the 2000–01 renovation. The project began April 23 and was completed in time for the 2012 season opener on September 1. The current scoreboard includes a Panasonic HD screen, stretching , and incorporates upgrades to the audio system and the LED running boards (which are the smaller screens underneath the larger screen that usually display score updates and advertisements). A Pro Sound audio system with 25 different speakers flank the scoreboard. Older speakers throughout the Horseshoe received improvements and will eventually be replaced by new speakers fitted into the existing framework.

Prior to the 2014 season, 2,500 seats were added to the south stands. These seats were built over the entrance tunnels and raised the official capacity of the stadium to 104,851, making it the third largest stadium in the country and the fourth largest stadium in the world. The renovations also included permanent lights added to the northeast and southeast corners of the stadium, as well as atop the press box, and the playing surface was replaced.

Field name 
The playing surface at Ohio Stadium is known as Safelite Field, named for Columbus-based Safelite, a glass repair company. The naming rights deal was announced August 26, 2022, and allows the company’s logos to be displayed on the field. The name of the facility, however, did not change.

Timeline of seating capacity

Night football games
Before the 2014 renovations, Ohio Stadium did not have permanent lights at the stadium, thus night games were rare. Ohio State's first night game in the stadium was played on September 14, 1985, when the #9 Buckeyes defeated the Pittsburgh Panthers, 10–7. Ohio State did not play another night game at Ohio Stadium until September 11, 1993, when the 16th-ranked Buckeyes defeated #12 Washington 21–12. Ohio State played a total of 12 more night games before permanent lighting was installed, nine of which were against ranked opponents. The Buckeyes are 16-5 (.762) overall and 9-1 (.900) in the Big Ten in night games through September 18, 2017. Ohio State's most recent night game was a 52-21 win versus Wisconsin on September 24, 2022.

Below is a table of teams the Buckeyes have faced in multiple night games at Ohio Stadium.

Largest attendance

Buckeye football
The largest crowd in stadium history is 110,045, set November 26, 2016, in a game against Michigan. The attendance broke the previous record of 108,975 set the previous year for the game against Michigan State. Ohio State has ranked in the top five for attendance for many years, and was the national leader in attendance for the 2014 season, averaging 106,296 people per game. The school set the national spring game record on April 16, 2016, when they drew 100,189 fans for their 2016 spring game. This broke the previous record of 99,391 set by the Buckeyes in their 2015 spring game.

Mel Kiper, Jr. ranked Ohio Stadium second in atmosphere in 2002, behind the Army–Navy Game, and quoted Beano Cook in saying "There is nothing that beats when the Ohio State Marching Band and the sousaphone player dots the 'i' for Script Ohio." The crowd attending these home games is known for creating harsh and difficult environments for opponents. University of Iowa coach Hayden Fry complained after a 1985 loss that the fans were too loud for his quarterback, Chuck Long, to call plays and suggested sound meters be used to gauge the noise level, penalizing home teams if there was too much noise. He said, "It's a realistic fact that happened. He became mentally disturbed for the first time since he's been a starter for us because of his inability to communicate."

O-H-I-O

One famous chant by the Buckeye fans, usually starting with the students in the South Stands, is O-H-I-O. The entire South end yells O then the East stands follow with H, the North with I and the West with O. The chant loops around the stadium loudly sometimes for 5 to 10 minutes. Before kickoff the entire stadium screams O continuously until the ball is kicked; immediately following the kick the stadium shouts in unison O-H-I-O.

Events

Columbus Crew
Major League Soccer games were held at Ohio Stadium between 1996 and 1998. The home opener was held on April 13, 1996, against D.C. United before 25,266 fans. Brian McBride scored 2 goals and had an assist in a 4–0 rout. The field at Ohio Stadium was the smallest in the MLS, measuring only 62 yards wide by 106 yards long, limited by the track surrounding it. Because of the smaller market for soccer than Ohio State football, B Deck, C Deck, and the South end zone seats were closed, leading to a capacity of 25,243.

Attendance stayed strong through the first season, seeing a record audience of 31,550 September 15, 1996 win over the MetroStars, 2–0. Despite the facility's size, problems like field dimensions and the lack of lighting pushed the Crew to find a new home. Jamey Rootes, Crew president and general manager stated, "We prefer a smaller, more intimate environment (than Ohio Stadium) … We've got to create a major league environment. Ohio Stadium is a great stadium, but we cannot create a major league environment in a facility that is way too big for us." The Crew finished their tenure at Ohio Stadium 30–18.

Concerts

Buckeye Country Superfest

Classic For Columbus 
On August 28, 2021, Ohio Stadium played host to the Classic For Columbus, which matched up two HBCUs, in Central State Marauders and Kentucky State Thorobreds. Kentucky State won 20–6 in front of approximately 20,000 fans.

High school
The stadium hosted the Ohio High School Athletic Association football championship games for all seven divisions from 2014 to 2016. The stadium had previously hosted the championships for Divisions I and III in 1982 and all divisions (five at the time) from 1983 to 1989.

International soccer
On July 27, 2016, a 2016 International Champions Cup match between Real Madrid and Paris Saint-Germain was held at Ohio Stadium. The match, won by Paris Saint-Germain 3–1, drew 86,641 fans, the largest crowd to ever see a soccer game in the state of Ohio.

See also
 List of NCAA Division I FBS football stadiums

References

External links

 
Stadium history on display at main library in The Lantern
WOSU history of stadium
The Ohio Stadium Story Highly detailed account of genesis, funding, and construction of Ohio Stadium
Stadium Journey Review of Ohio Stadium
Ohio Stadium under construction in 1922
Ohio Stadium under construction in 1921

Ohio State Buckeyes football venues
Ohio State Buckeyes track and field venues
American football venues in Ohio
Athletics (track and field) venues in Ohio
College football venues
Defunct athletics (track and field) venues in the United States
Former Major League Soccer stadiums
National Register of Historic Places in Columbus, Ohio
Rotundas (architecture)
Soccer venues in Ohio
Sports venues in Columbus, Ohio
Sports venues on the National Register of Historic Places in Ohio
University District (Columbus, Ohio)
Ohio State University buildings
Ohio State Buckeyes men's lacrosse
College lacrosse venues in the United States